SSSC may refer to:
 Street Sweeper Social Club, American rap rock supergroup
 Superior shoulder suspensory complex, anatomical term
 Scottish Social Services Council
 Static synchronous series compensator, a type of Flexible AC transmission system
 Supreme State Security Court  in the Judiciary of Syria